Hunt is a hamlet and census-designated place (CDP) in Livingston County, New York, United States. Its population was 78 as of the 2010 census. Hunt has a post office with ZIP code 14846.

History
The G.A.R. Memorial Hall on Main Street was added to the National Register of Historic Places in 2006.

Geography
Hunt is just south of the center of the town of Portage in the southwestern corner of Livingston County.

Demographics

References

Hamlets in Livingston County, New York
Hamlets in New York (state)
Census-designated places in Livingston County, New York
Census-designated places in New York (state)